"You Know What" is a song by American singer Avant featuring rapper Lil Wayne. It was written by Avant, Lil Wayne, Jermaine Dupri, and Manuel Seal for his fourth studio album Director (2006), while production was helmed by Dupri and Seal. Geffen Records released the song as the lead single from the album. It peaked at number 58 on the US Billboard Hot R&B/Hip-Hop Songs. A video for the song was directed by Benny Boom.

Music video
An accompanying music video for "You Know What" was directed by Benny Boom and filmed in Los Angeles, California. The video shows Avant finding a girl, portrayed by Candace Pillay, and gets attracted to her. When they start kissing, they are interrupted by someone three times.

Track listings

Charts

References

2006 singles
2006 songs
Avant songs
Lil Wayne songs
Geffen Records singles
Music videos directed by Benny Boom
Song recordings produced by Jermaine Dupri